Procapperia kuldschaensis is a moth of the family Pterophoridae. It is found in Ukraine, Kyrgyzstan, Uzbekistan, Pakistan, China, Mongolia, southern Afghanistan and the Tian Shan area.

The larvae possibly feed on Dracocephalum nutans.

References

Moths described in 1914
Oxyptilini
Taxa named by Hans Rebel
Moths of Europe
Moths of Asia